Pierre Pigray was a French surgeon born in Paris in 1531.  He was a student of the famous surgeon, Ambroise Paré before qualifying as a master surgeon in 1564.  In addition to his service to the wounded in the Battle of Dreux (1562), Pigray was best known for being the surgeon-in-ordinary to King Charles IX, King Henri III, and King Henri IV.  He died 16 October 1613.

References 

  Francis R. Packard, Life and Times of Ambroise Pare (New York:  Paul B. Hoeber, 1921) 253.

16th-century French physicians